The 2023 Miami RedHawks football team will represent Miami University as a member of the East Division of the Mid-American Conference (MAC) during the 2022 NCAA Division I FBS football season. They will be led by tenth-year head coach Chuck Martin and played their home games at Yager Stadium in Oxford, Ohio.

Previous season

The RedHawks finished the 2021 season 6-7, 4–4 in MAC play to finish second in the East Division. They received an invitation to the 2022 Bahamas Bowl where they lost to UAB 20–24.

Transfer portal

Outgoing

Incoming

Schedule

References

Miami
Miami RedHawks football seasons
Miami RedHawks football